Anthony Traill (1 November 1838 – 15 October 1914) was a Provost of Trinity College Dublin.

Born at Ballylough, in County Antrim, Anthony Traill matriculated at Trinity College Dublin, where he was elected a Scholar in 1858. He became a fellow in 1865, and while at college he accumulated degrees in engineering, law and medicine.

Although he was most famous for the position he would acquire later in life, Traill was actively involved in politics during the 1870s and 1880s. He was an Ulster Unionist, and sided with the landlords during the debate over land tenure reform. In 1884 he was appointed High Sheriff of Antrim. He also became the chairman of the world's first electric tramway, Portrush, founded with his brother William. The Portrush electric tramway ran from Portrush to Bushmills from its inception in 1883 (with Traill as chairman) until 1947.

In April 1901 he was appointed Commissioner of National Education in Ireland.

1904, Traill was appointed Provost of Trinity College Dublin. During his hold of the office, he carried out many internal reforms. Traill refused to change the University's constitutional position at any time in his Provostship despite pressure. He remained the Provost until he died, at the Provost's House, in 1914.

References

1838 births
1914 deaths
Fellows of Trinity College Dublin
High Sheriffs of Antrim
People from County Antrim
Provosts of Trinity College Dublin
Scholars of Trinity College Dublin